Lajen is a comune (municipality) in South Tyrol in northern Italy, located about  northeast of the city of Bolzano.

Geography

Lajen borders the following municipalities: Barbian, Kastelruth, Klausen, Urtijëi, Villanders, Villnöß and Waidbruck.

Frazioni
The municipality of Lajen contains the frazioni (subdivisions, mainly villages and hamlets) Albions, Freins (Fraina), Ried (Novale), St. Peter (San Pietro), Tanirz (Tanurza) and Tschöfas (Ceves).

Society

Linguistic distribution
According to the 2011 census, 89.93% of the population speak German, 3.93% Italian and 6.14% Ladin as first language.

Demographic evolution

References

External links
 Homepage of the municipality

Municipalities of South Tyrol